Ottakkovilpatti is a village located in Madurai District in the State of Tamil Nadu, India. The village is 22 km from Melur and 50 km from Madurai.

References

Madurai district